SYS may indicate:
SYS (command), a DOS command used to make a medium bootable
SYS Technologies, an information technology company 
ISO 639-3 code of the Sinyar language
IATA code of the Saskylakh Airport
.sys filename extension
Sun Yat-sen